Jack Arthur Bailey (22 June 1930 – 12 July 2018) was an English first-class cricketer and administrator.

Born in Brixton, London, Bailey was educated at Christ's Hospital and University College, Oxford. He represented Essex and Oxford University as a tail-end right-handed batsman and a right-arm fast-medium bowler in 112 first-class matches between 1953 and 1958. He took 347 wickets at an average of 21.62. Among his many matches for Marylebone Cricket Club were tours to East Africa, South America, Canada and the United States, Holland and Denmark. Playing for MCC against Ireland in a first-class match in 1966, Bailey returned match figures of 13 for 57, taking 5 for 33 in the first innings and a career-best 8 for 24 in the second.

He succeeded Billy Griffith as Secretary of the MCC in 1974, following a spell as Assistant Secretary. He resigned in controversial circumstances in 1987, following a dispute over the ceding of further power to the Test and County Cricket Board.

Bailey wrote a biography of his Essex teammate Trevor Bailey (Trevor Bailey: A Life in Cricket, 1993) and a memoir of his time at Lord's (Conflicts in Cricket, 1989). He also wrote for The Sunday Telegraph and The Times.

He died on 12 July 2018 at the age of 88.

References

External links
Jack Bailey at Cricinfo
Jack Bailey at CricketArchive

1930 births
2018 deaths
English cricket administrators
English cricketers
Essex cricketers
Oxford University cricketers
Free Foresters cricketers
Secretaries of the Marylebone Cricket Club
Gentlemen cricketers
Marylebone Cricket Club cricketers
People educated at Christ's Hospital
Alumni of University College, Oxford
Cricketers from Greater London
Cricket historians and writers
T. N. Pearce's XI cricketers